Oyndarfjørður is a village on the northeastern coast of the Faroese island of Eysturoy in the Runavíkar municipality.

The 2020 population was 143. Its postal code is FO 690. The town's church dates from 1838. It is famous for two rinkusteinar, or rocking stones, located in the sea nearby.

The name of the village is derived from the man's name Oyvindur (which is Eyvindur in Icelandic). The village was isolated until the road from the south reached the village in 1969.

There is a hiking trail over old overland postal routes north from Fuglafjørður to Oyndarfjørður (with Youth Hostel), then west to Elduvík, then south to Funningsfjørður and back to Fuglafjørður.

See also
 List of towns in the Faroe Islands

References

External links

Personal Danish site with photographs of Oyndarfjordur

Populated places in the Faroe Islands

hu:Oyndarfjørður